J. Frank Dobie High School is a public secondary school located in Houston, Texas. Founded in 1968, it is named after the Texas writer of the same name. It houses grades 10-12. A Ninth Grade Center was opened recently to help with the influx of students. It is the largest school in the Pasadena Independent School District. The school mascots are the Longhorns and the official colors are orange and black, similar to that of the University of Texas at Austin.

Dobie High School was originally located at 11111 Beamer Rd. However, overcrowding problems at the Beamer campus and the rapidly growing population in the South Belt area lead city officials and voters to pass a $199.05 million bond in February 2000. This included a new  location to be built at 10220 Blackhawk Blvd which opened in 2003.

The original Beamer location is now occupied by Beverly Hills Intermediate School.

History
In 2014, PISD announced plans to create a 9th grade center in order to reduce overcrowding at Dobie High. In 2015, the district revealed the design plans for the 9th grade center, and groundbreaking occurred in August 2016. The Dobie Ninth Grade campus opened its doors on January 9, 2018 and a dedication ceremony was held on December 6, 2018.

Athletics, clubs, and organizations
Athletics offered at Dobie High School include:
 Athletic trainers
 Baseball
 Basketball
 Bowling
 Cheerleaders
 Cross Country
 Football
 Golf
 Power Lifting
 Soccer
 Softball
 Swimming
 Tennis
 Track
 Volleyball

Dobie High School also offers various clubs and organizations including:

 Academic Decathlon (ACDEC)
 Air Force Junior Reserve Officers' Training Corps (AFJROTC)
 Art Club
 Band
 Best Buddies
 Business Professionals of America (BPA)
 Chess
 Choir
 Color Guard
 Distributive Education Clubs of America (DECA)
 Environmental Science
 Étalage
 Fellowship of Christian Athletes (FCA)
 Family, Career and Community Leaders of America (FCCLA)
 Future Farmers of America (FFA)
 French Club
 German Club
 Health Occupations Students of America (HOSA)
 Journalism
 Key Club
 Lariaettes
 Latin Club
 Math Club
 National Hispanic Honor Society
 National Honor Society
 Newspaper
 Orchestra
 Robotics
 Science Club
 Senior Hearts
 Skills USA
 Speech/Debate Team
 Spanish Club
 Student Council
 Texas Association of Future Educators (TAFE)
 Thespian Society
 Yearbook

Academic Decathlon
Dobie High School's Academic Decathlon teams took home the national championship in 1992 and 1996, and second in the nation in 2011.

Speech and Debate 
Students from the school have been successful in the National Speech and Debate Association Tournaments.

Standardized dress
In 2011 Dobie High School had a standardized dress code and students are required to wear identification badges above the waist on a lanyard on campus.

The Texas Education Agency specified that the parents or guardians of students zoned to a school with uniforms may apply for a waiver to opt out of the uniform policy so their children do not have to wear the uniform; parents must specify "bona fide" reasons, such as religious reasons or philosophical objections.

Feeder schools and neighborhoods served by Dobie High School
Beverly Hills Intermediate and Thompson Intermediate are the two feeder schools for Dobie High School.

The school serves portions of Houston in the South Belt/Ellington area (including Riverstone Ranch, and Sagemont.) and portions of Pearland. Dobie High School also zones portions of Southeast Houston (Bridge Gate).

Notable alumni
 Mary Campbell-Fox, DO. - 1976 graduate; Chief of Staff Memorial Hermann Southeast Hospital 2003
 Gawain Guy - 1981 graduate; participant in the 1984 Summer Olympics for Jamaica
 Ken Howery - 1993 graduate; Stanford graduate, co-founder of PayPal and co-founder of The Founders Fund
 Heather Ogilvie - 1996 graduate; Miss Texas USA 2000
 Christa Lee Williams - 1996 graduate; gold medalist at the 1996 and 2000 Summer Olympics (softball)
 Lionel Dotson - NFL player, free agent having played for the Miami Dolphins, Buffalo Bills, and Denver Broncos.
 Karima Christmas - 2007 graduate; professional basketball player for the WNBA's Indiana Fever, 2012 WNBA Champions
 Blake Jackson - 2012 graduate; Wide Receiver for the Cleveland Browns

References

External links

 J. Frank Dobie High School
 
  
 PISD official website

Pasadena Independent School District high schools
Public high schools in Houston